The first case of the COVID-19 pandemic was confirmed in the Indian state of Odisha on 16 March 2020. The state has confirmed 10,00,084 cases, including 9,497 active cases, 9,83,245 recoveries, and 7,289 deaths as of 21 August 2021.

Containment Strategy 
In Cuttack, the Cuttack Municipal Corporation has formed a strategy wherein the city has been divided into three zones and officials have been deployed in order to ensure lockdown guidelines.

Public Health Strategy 
To lay more emphasis on testing, Director of National Health Mission (NHM) in Odisha has proposed a strategy to let social welfare workers go door-to-door to test people for COVID-19 symptoms. The strategy is to be implemented in rural areas and slums of urban areas as well.

Immediate NGO Relief 
Bhubaneswar Municipal Corporation (BMC) has partnered with 28 stores to ensure supplies are distributed to residents in the city in the midst of a lockdown. Some of these stores include Reliance Fresh, Big Bazaar, Vishal Mega Mart, Aadhar Fresh.

Rourkela Municipal Corporation collaborated with different NGOs to deliver thousands of cooked food packets to the needy and destitute persons in the city. The corporation has also taken measures for home delivery of grocery items and medicines. A list of Medicine Stores, that have agreed for home delivery of medicines in their concerned area of operation.

Public awareness Campaigns 
As per Deccan Herald, Chief Secretary A K Tripathy issued directions to Information and Public Relation, Panchayati Raj and Drinking Water, Women and Child Development and Mission Shakti Departments to intensify IEC (Information, Education and Communication) activities with the active involvement of the community. The progress for the special awareness campaign "Mu bi Covid Joddha" (I am also a Covid warrior) was checked upon and an order to intensify the campaign has been passed.

An active involvement of women self help groups, panchayati raj institutions, farmer producer groups and school management committees have been established. The themes of the campaign include personal hygiene, hand washing use of mask, social distancing, care of the old and vulnerable, eradication of social stigma, self- monitoring, and community surveillance quarantine.

Economy 
Due to COVID-19, economic activities in rural areas have been hit hard with rabi crops being completely ruined. To revive the agricultural economy, a meeting was held in May 2020, chaired by Chief Minister Naveen Patnaik. The State Government assured to increase the supply of fertilizers, seeds and other necessary agricultural machinery, and activities such as fish farming, poultry farming, horticulture, and dairy farming are reviving gradually. Additionally, activities to introduce more labor-intensive programs in different sector have been initiated by Departments of Water Resources, Rural Development, Works and Forest and Environment.

Other industries like IT and MSME sectors are also affected. With US and Europe suffering as well, very little projects are being renewed in IT industry and employees are being laid off.

Since 92% of the state's total workforce is in unorganized sector (approx. 1.62 crore people), livelihood and employment have become extremely challenging. One of the major revenue for Odisha comes from excise duty and with liquor shops being closed, a loss of around 1500 crore is to be expected.

Education 
The shutting down of school and education facilities have not only affected students, parents and teachers but also the economy of the country. In Odisha, commissioner-cum-secretary, Saswat Mishra, advised the Vice chancellors of all the universities to shift to online classes and vacate the hostel premises.

The state was also ready to provide online education to the rural areas. Binayak Acharya, with the help of ThinkZone, had already been developing a home-based model of learning for parents to engage their children. He collaborated his model with the State Government and utilizing the resources and outreach, the program was adopted in various parts of the state.

In April 2020, the state government along with UNICEF provided a fun-filled calendar list of events to keep more than 16 lakh children involved in a positive way during lockdown. The program emphasizes reaching out to parents to keep their kids actively engaged through action songs, dance, painting and storytelling based on the month's prescribed theme. It even laid down the habits of following social distancing in an easier fashion that could be understood by children. Furthermore, for families with no internet facilities, printed copies of the calendar are being provided.

On 12 June 2020, the state government decided to cancel all pending exams at university level for the session 2019–2020. A provision was made for students to reappear for exams in November if they were unsatisfied with their grades.

Migrant Workers Crisis 
Odisha prepared an online database of returning migrants since the first case was discovered in the state. Due to this, the state government knew that approx 78,233 persons had returned from other states to Odisha on the day of the national lockdown, with district and panchayat specifically tallyed. The panchayat members encouraged the returning migrants to self-isolate themselves. In order to ensure their period of quarantine, the state announced a cash incentive of Rs. 15,000 to all those who completed self-isolation keeping the guidelines in mind and following the correct procedures issued by the government.

Statistics

Gallery

COVID-19 Vaccines with Approval for Emergency or Conditional Usage 

Covishield

On January 1, 2021, the Drug Controller General of India, approved the emergency or conditional use of AstraZeneca's COVID-19 vaccine AZD1222 (marketed as Covishield). Covishield is developed by the University of Oxford and its spin-out company, Vaccitech. It's a viral vector vaccine based on replication-deficient Adenovirus that causes cold in Chimpanzees.

Covaxin

On January 2, 2021, BBV152 (marketed as Covaxin), first indigenous vaccine, developed by Bharat Biotech in association with the Indian Council of Medical Research and National Institute of Virology received approval from the Drug Controller General of India for its emergency or conditional usage.

See also
 COVID-19 pandemic in India
 COVID-19 pandemic
 COVID-19 pandemic by country and territory
 COVID-19 pandemic cases
 COVID-19 pandemic deaths
 ଓଡ଼ିଶାରେ କୋଭିଡ-୧୯ ମହାମାରୀ

References

External links
COVID-19 Dashboard By Health Department (1) (Department of Health and Family Welfare) Of Odisha.
COVID-19 District Wise Dashboard By Health Department (2)  (Department of Health and Family Welfare) Of Odisha.
COVID-19 State Dashboard of Odisha By Health Department (3) (Department of Health and Family Welfare) Of Odisha.
COVID-19 Status By Mohfw (Ministry of Health and Family Welfare) Of India.
COVID-19 Details In Odisha By Covid-19 Odisha.
COVID-19 Details In India By Covid-19 India.
COVID-19 Statistics In India By MyGov. 
COVID-19 Details Worldwide By Worldometers. 
COVID-19 Map Worldwide By Google News.
COVID-19 Pandemic Worldwide By WHO (World Health Organization).

Odisha
2020s in Odisha
Health in Odisha
Disasters in Odisha